"My Telephone" is a song recorded by British band Coldcut featuring Lisa Stansfield, released as a single from Coldcut's debut album, What's That Noise? (1989). It was written by Matt Black, Jonathan More, Stansfield, Ian Devaney, Andy Morris and Tim Parry, and produced by Coldcut.

The recording provided the basis for the song "Telephone Thing" by post-punk band The Fall, recorded with Coldcut and released in January 1990.

Critical reception
Jerry Smith from Music Week wrote, "Having just had a massive hit with the unforgettable "People Hold On", Coldcut lift another track from their current What's That Noise? LP. It's a more innovative number but still with an irresistible hook in the chorus harmonies and set to give them yet more success."

Music video
A music video was produced to promote the single, directed by Big T.V. It doesn't feature Stansfield.

Track listings

 European 7" single
"My Telephone" (Edit) – 3:50
"Theme from Evil Eddy" – 3:41

 European CD maxi single
"My Telephone" (Edit) – 3:50
"My Telephone" (Redial) – 7:20
"Theme from Evil Eddy" (Hedmaster Mix) – 7:17

 European 12" single
"My Telephone" (Redial) – 7:20
"Theme from Evil Eddy" (Hedmaster Mix) – 7:17

 European 12" single (Disconnect Mixes)
"My Telephone" (Disconnect Mixes Parts 1-4) – 10:33 
"Chase from Evil Eddy" – 2:29
"My Telephone" (Disconnect Mixes Parts 5-8) – 6:41

 French 12" single
"My Telephone" (Redial) – 7:20
"People Hold On" (Dimitri Remix) – 6:45

Charts

References

1989 singles
1989 songs
Acid house songs
Coldcut songs
Lisa Stansfield songs
Music videos directed by Big T.V.
Songs about telephones
Songs written by Lisa Stansfield